Confessions of an Invisible Girl is a 2021 Brazilian teen comedy film directed by Bruno Garotti from a screenplay he co-wrote with Flávia Lins e Silva and Christiana Oliveira, based on the 2016 novel Confissões de uma Garota Excluída, Mal Amada e (Um Pouco) Dramática by Thalita Rebouças. The film stars Marcus Bessa, Caio Cabral and Klara Castanho.

Cast
 Marcus Bessa as Zeca
 Caio Cabral
 Klara Castanho as Tetê
 Fernanda Concon as Laís
 Rosane Gofman
 Júlia Gomes as Valentina
 Gabriel Lima as Davi
 Kiria Malheiros
 Stepan Nercessian
 Lucca Picon
 Júlia Rabello
 Alcemar Vieira

References

External links
 
 

2021 films
2021 comedy films
2020s high school films
2020s Portuguese-language films
2020s teen comedy films
Brazilian comedy films
Films based on Brazilian novels
Films based on young adult literature
Films set in Rio de Janeiro (city)
Portuguese-language Netflix original films